Wollstonecraft railway station is located on the North Shore line, serving the Sydney suburb of Wollstonecraft. It is served by Sydney Trains T1 North Shore line services.

History
Wollstonecraft station opened on 1 May 1893 when the North Shore line opened from St Leonards to Milsons Point. Originally named Edwards Road, it was renamed on 1 September 1900. The original buildings were replaced in the 1980s.

The platform is located on a sharp 200-metre radius curve, leading to complaints from residents about the squeal from train wheels.

In May 2022, an upgrade to the station was opened including lifts and regrading of the platform.

Platforms and services

Transport links
Busways operates one route via Wollstonecraft station:
265: Lane Cove to North Sydney

Wollstonecraft station is served by one Nightride route:
N90: Hornsby station to Town Hall station

References

External links

Wollstonecraft station details Transport for New South Wales

Railway stations in Sydney
Railway stations in Australia opened in 1893
North Shore railway line
Wollstonecraft